John Pearson (22 January 1892 – 13 April 1937) was a Scottish professional footballer who played as a left back in the Football League for Tottenham Hotspur and Luton Town. He also played in his native Scotland for Arbroath and Partick Thistle.

Career 
Pearson began his career with his hometown club Arbroath. In 1914, the left back moved to England to join First Division club Tottenham Hotspur, for whom he played a total of 51 matches in all competitions between 1914 and 1923. Pearson signed for Luton Town in 1923 and made one league appearance before ending his playing career.

Personal life 
Pearson served in the Royal Navy during the First World War.

Career statistics

References 

1892 births
1937 deaths
People from Arbroath
Scottish footballers
English Football League players
Arbroath F.C. players
Tottenham Hotspur F.C. players
Luton Town F.C. players
Association football fullbacks
Scottish Football League players
Partick Thistle F.C. players
Royal Navy personnel of World War I
Footballers from Angus, Scotland